WCLR may refer to:

 WCLR (FM), a radio station (92.5 FM) licensed to serve DeKalb, Illinois, United States
 WKLV-FM, a radio station (93.5 FM) licensed to serve Butler, Alabama, United States, which held the call sign WCLR from 2017 to 2018
 WCLR (Arlington Heights, Illinois), a radio station (88.3 FM) licensed to serve Arlington Heights, Illinois, United States, which broadcast from 2001 to 2017
 The former call sign of WHIO-FM (95.7), held from 1989 to 2000
 The former call sign of WTMX (101.9 FM), held from 1970 to 1989
 The former call sign of WAIT (AM) (850 AM), held from 1965 to 1969
 Waccamaw Coast Line Railroad